Italian Intermezzo is a different kind of outing for jazz guitarist Bucky Pizzarelli. The songs come from Italian folk music and the opera, and Ken Peplowski co-leads this sextet with him. The album was marketed as part of a dinner music series, and is supposed to be optimal for playing during an authentic Italian meal.

Track listing
 "Ah! Marie"
 "Non Dimenticar"
 "Ciribiribin"
 "Arrivederci Roma"
 "Core 'Ngrato"
 "Anema E Core"
 "Funiculi, Funicula"
 "Mattinata"
 "Torna A Surriento"
 "Malafemena"
 "Vieni Sul Mar" 
 "O Sole Mio"
 "Santa Lucia"
 "Tarantella"

Personnel
 Bucky Pizzarelliguitar
 Ken Peplowskiclarinet
 Frederico Britos Ruizviolin
 Lou Palloguitar
 Greg Cohendouble-bass
 Charlie Giordanoaccordion

2000 albums
Bucky Pizzarelli albums
Ken Peplowski albums
Swing albums